Tenju (天授) was a Japanese era name (年号, nengō, lit. year name) of the Southern Court during the Era of Northern and Southern Courts after Bunchū and before Kōwa. This period spanned the years from May 1375 to February 1381.

Nanboku-chō overview
   
During the Meiji period, an Imperial decree dated March 3, 1911 established that the legitimate reigning monarchs of this period were the direct descendants of Emperor Go-Daigo through Emperor Go-Murakami, whose  had been established in exile in Yoshino, near Nara.

Until the end of the Edo period, the militarily superior pretender-Emperors supported by the Ashikaga shogunate had been mistakenly incorporated in Imperial chronologies despite the undisputed fact that the Imperial Regalia were not in their possession.

This illegitimate  had been established in Kyoto by Ashikaga Takauji.

Change of era
 1375, also called : The new era name was created to mark an event or series of events. The previous era ended and the new one commenced in Bunchū 4.

In this time frame, Eiwa (1375–1379) and Kōryaku (1379–1381) were the Northern Court equivalent nengō.

Events of the Tenju Era
 1375 (Tenju 1): Shōgun Ashikaga Yoshimitsu visits the Iwashimizu Hachiman-gū where he worships publicly; and he offers a sword for the shrine's treasury, gold foil for the embellishment of the shrine, and a racehorses for the shrine's stable.
 1375 (Tenju 2): For the first time, Shōgun Yoshimitsu is permitted to enter the precincts of the Imperial quarters at the Imperial palace in Kyoto.
The objective of this diplomatic mission was to begin neogiating steps to control pirates (wakō).
 1378 (Tenju 4): Yoshimitsu moves into his new home in Muromachi; and the luxurious house and grounds are called Hana-no-Gosho
 1379 (Tenju 5): Shiba Yoshimasa becomes Kanrei.
 1380 (Tenju 6): Kusunoki Masanori rejoins Kameyama; southern army suffers reverses.
 July 26, 1380 (Tenju 6, 24th day of the 6th month): The former Emperor Kōmyō died at age 60.

Notes

References
 Ackroyd, Joyce. (1982) Lessons from History: The Tokushi Yoron. Brisbane: University of Queensland Press. 
 Mehl, Margaret. (1997). History and the State in Nineteenth-Century Japan. New York: St Martin's Press. ; OCLC 419870136
 Nussbaum, Louis Frédéric and Käthe Roth. (2005). Japan Encyclopedia. Cambridge: Harvard University Press. ; OCLC 48943301
 Thomas, Julia Adeney. (2001). Reconfiguring Modernity: Concepts of Nature in Japanese Political Ideology. Berkeley: University of California Press. ; 
 Titsingh, Isaac, ed. (1834). [Siyun-sai Rin-siyo/Hayashi Gahō, 1652], Nipon o daï itsi ran; ou,  Annales des empereurs du Japon.  Paris: Oriental Translation Fund of Great Britain and Ireland.  OCLC  84067437

Japanese eras
1370s in Japan
1380s in Japan